Nyulnyul or Nyul Nyul may refer to:

Nyulnyul people, an Aboriginal Australian people of Western Australia
Nyulnyul language, an extinct Australian Aboriginal dialect formerly spoken by the Nyulnyul people